is a Japanese footballer currently playing as a midfielder for J.League club Avispa Fukuoka.

Career statistics

Club
.

Notes

References

External links

1996 births
Living people
Association football people from Hokkaido
Sapporo University alumni
Japanese footballers
Association football midfielders
J2 League players
Mito HollyHock players